Reidar Sørlie (12 March 1909 – 12 February 1969) was a Norwegian discus thrower.  
 
He finished fourth at the 1936 Summer Olympics with a throw of 48.77 metres and eighth at the 1938 European Championships with 46.36 metres. He became Norwegian champion in the years 1936-1939. The Norwegian championships were cancelled from 1940-1945 due to World War II. Despite choosing a career as a driver, he was always known by his nickname: The Discus Thrower.

His personal best discus throw was 51.57 metres, achieved in September 1937 in Sarpsborg.

References

1909 births
1969 deaths
Norwegian male discus throwers
Athletes (track and field) at the 1936 Summer Olympics
Olympic athletes of Norway